Andex insignis is a species of beetles in the family Dytiscidae, the only species in the genus Andex.

References

Dytiscidae genera
Monotypic Adephaga genera